The Seventh Wisconsin Legislature convened from January 11, 1854, to April 3, 1854, in regular session.

Senators representing even-numbered districts were newly elected for this session and were serving the first year of a two-year term.  Assemblymembers were elected to a one-year term.  Assemblymembers and odd-numbered senators were elected in the general election of November 8, 1853.  Senators representing odd-numbered districts were serving the second year of their two-year term, having been elected in the general election held on November 2, 1852.

Major events
 January 2, 1854: Inauguration of William A. Barstow as the 3rd Governor of Wisconsin.
 March 20, 1854: A local meeting was held at Ripon, Wisconsin, to oppose the proposed Kansas–Nebraska Act—later cited as the birth of the Republican Party.
 May 30, 1854: U.S. President Franklin Pierce signed the Kansas–Nebraska Act.
 July 13, 1854: The Republican Party of Wisconsin was established at a convention in Madison, Wisconsin.
 November 7, 1854: Wisconsin voters rejected three amendments to the Constitution of Wisconsin which would have doubled legislative terms and instituted biennial legislative sessions.

Major legislation
 January 30, 1854: Act to organize the County of Trempe a l'eau, 1854 Act 2
 February 9, 1854: Act to organize the County of Dunn, 1854 Act 7
 February 11, 1854: Act to divide La Pointe county and create the county of Douglass, 1854 Act 10
 March 6, 1854: Act to divide the sixth Judicial Circuit and organize an eighth Judicial Circuit, and to fix the time for holding the Circuit Courts in the Counties of the respective circuits, 1854 Act 13
 March 24, 1854: Act to divide the county of La Crosse and organize the county of Monroe, 1854 Act 35
 March 30, 1854: Act concerning the terms of office of Judges of the several courts of this State, 1854 Act 41. Standardized state judicial terms as starting the first Monday of the year following the election of that judge.
 March 31, 1854: Act to provide for the appointment of an Assistant Secretary of State and Assistant State Treasurer, and to prescribe their duties, 1854 Act 65
 April 24, 1854: Act to divide the second and third Judicial Circuits and organize the ninth Judicial Circuit, and to fix the time of holding the Circuit Courts in the Counties of said respective Circuits, 1854 Act 75
 April 25, 1854: Act to amend Article Four of the Constitution, 1854 Act 89.  Created a referendum to modify the lengths of State Senate terms from two years to four years, and for the Assembly from one year to two years, and to change the Legislative sessions from one year to two years.  The referendum was rejected by voters in November.

Party summary

Senate summary

Assembly summary

Sessions
 1st Regular session: January 11, 1854 – April 3, 1854

Leaders

Senate leadership
 President of the Senate: James T. Lewis, Lieutenant Governor
 President pro tempore: Benjamin Allen

Assembly leadership
 Speaker of the Assembly: Frederick W. Horn

Members

Members of the Senate
Members of the Wisconsin Senate for the Seventh Wisconsin Legislature:

Members of the Assembly
Members of the Assembly for the Seventh Wisconsin Legislature (82):

Employees

Senate employees
 Chief Clerk: Samuel G. Bugh
 Sergeant-at-Arms: J. M. Sherwood

Assembly employees
 Chief Clerk: Thomas McHugh
 Sergeant-at-Arms: William H. Gleason

References

External links

1854 in Wisconsin
Wisconsin
Wisconsin legislative sessions